Tiku may refer to:
 Tiku, Iran
 Pulau Tikus, Malaysia
 Tiku Talsania, (born 1954), Indian actor